Goniodoris mercurialis is a species of sea slug, a dorid nudibranch, a marine gastropod mollusc in the family Goniodorididae.

Distribution
This species was first described from False Bay, South Africa. It is found on both sides of the Cape Peninsula.

Description
This goniodorid nudibranch is translucent tan in colour, with large areas of white surface pigment on the oral tentacles and the back and sides of the body.

Ecology
Goniodoris mercurialis feeds on colonial ascidians.

References

Goniodorididae
Gastropods described in 1958